José Vanzzino (born 5 July 1893 – 29 June 1977) was a Uruguayan footballer. He played in 23 matches for the Uruguay national football team from 1913 to 1927. He was also part of Uruguay's squad for the 1916 South American Championship.

References

External links
 

1893 births
1977 deaths
Uruguayan footballers
Uruguay international footballers
Association football midfielders
Club Nacional de Football players